Vijayabahu IV (died October 1270) was King of Dambadeniya in the 13th century, who ruled from 1267/8 to 1270. He succeeded his father Parakkamabahu II as King of Dambadeniya and was succeeded by his brother Bhuvanaikabahu I.

See also
 List of Sri Lankan monarchs
 History of Sri Lanka

References

External links
 Kings & Rulers of Sri Lanka
 Codrington's Short History of Ceylon

Monarchs of Dambadeniya
House of Siri Sanga Bo
V
 Sinhalese Buddhist monarchs
V